The 1972 Caribe Hilton Invitational was a women's tennis tournament played on outdoor hard courts at the Caribe Hilton Hotel in San Juan, Puerto Rico that was part of the 1972 Women's Tennis Circuit. It was the second edition of the tournament in the open era and was held from March 27 through April 2, 1972. Third-seeded Nancy Gunter won the singles title and earned $3,500 first-prize money.

Finals

Singles
 Nancy Gunter defeated  Chris Evert 6–1, 6–3

Doubles
 Rosemary Casals /  Billie Jean King defeated  Karen Krantzcke /  Judy Tegart-Dalton 6–2, 6–3

References

Caribe Hilton Invitational
Puerto Rico Open (tennis)
Puerto Rico Open, 1972